Richard Dyle Bezuidenhout is a Tanzanian-born Canadian film actor and producer who won the second season of the reality competition Big Brother Africa (season 2) in 2007.

Film career
Bezuidenhout's film acting and production careers started after winning Big brother Africa show in 2007.Right after the show, he was cast in Nollywood film 'Player no.1 with Ini Edo, Jackie Appiah, following a successful career in Bongo movies film industry including a 2008 film, 'Family Tears' collaborating with the likes of Steven Kanumba and Wema Sepetu. He used part of the money he won in the competition to buy filming equipments to start producing his own movies. In 2011 he starred in an award winning film, 'Zamora' starred by Richa Adhia.

Big Brother controversies
Bezuidenhout could be named as one of the most controversial Big Brother Africa show’s winners. That is because of his sexual affairs with Nigerian contestant, Ofunneka Molokwu, who was totally drunk by the moment of their relation’s edge. Despite that on the next day Ofunneka told Big Brother, that she totally understood, what was going on, many viewers accused Bezuidenhout of the sexual abuse, nevertheless, he went on winning the show.

Even after winning the show, the troubles for him continued when rumors of an affair between Bezuidenhout and his Angolan housemate Tatiana, was revealed also a fellow housemate called Kemens  blamed the show managers for his exit from the show labeled it as 'planned' since he thought Bezuidenhout did more  controversial thing compared to what he had done.

Filmography

References

External links

Richard Bezuidenhout at BongoCinema

Living people
Tanzanian male actors
21st-century Canadian male actors
21st-century Tanzanian actors
1982 births